The M9 Bayonet, officially known as the M9 Phrobis III, is a multi-purpose knife and bayonet officially adopted in 1986 by the United States. It has a  blade and is issued with a sheath designed to double as a wire cutter.

History

The M9 bayonet was designed and developed by Charles A. "Mickey" Finn at his R&D company, Qual-A-Tec. It is a refined copy of the Russian AKM 6H3 bayonet. He later produced it under the Phrobis III name, filling a military contract for 325,000 units. Buck Knives was contracted to make 300,000 units and sold a commercial version under their own name. Finn's designs proved extremely popular, and were widely counterfeited and sold illegally by other makers. In 1989, Finn received , however, unlicensed copies continued to flow unchecked into the United States from Asia and Mexico, cutting into legitimate sales.

After the Phrobis III bayonet contract was completed, rights to the M9 reverted to the United States Army and there were many subsequent versions from other companies. It is issued by the armed forces of the U.S. and other countries, and has also been sold commercially in various versions.

Some production runs of the M9 have a fuller and some do not, depending upon which contractor manufactured that batch and what the military specs were at the time.  The M9 Bayonet partially replaced the older M7 Bayonet, introduced in 1964. Although it has been claimed that the M9 may be more prone to breakage than the older M7, the M9 bayonet has a 20% thicker blade and tang (0.235" vs. 0.195") and a 75% greater cross-sectional area of steel in the blade than the M7.

Variants
The M11 knife (not strictly a bayonet as it has no mounting catch or muzzle ring; more of a revision to the Buckmaster 184/188 knife, which was the basis for the Phrobis XM-9 prototype bayonet), or M11 EOD is a version of the M9 specialized for explosive ordnance disposal (EOD). It has some extra features, such as a hammer pommel, but uses the same blade and sheath as the M9.

Makes

There have been five main makes of M9s: Phrobis, Buck (subcontracted by Phrobis III during the original Army contract), LanCay, Ontario and Tri-Technologies. Starting in 1987, Phrobis subcontracted Buck, finishing up in 1989. It was around this time that Buck sold commercial M9s as well, which it did up to 1997.

LanCay got its first contract in March 1992 (taking over production from Buck) for 30 (later 50) thousand knives (with General Cutlery as a subcontractor); in 1994, there was another contract issued for about 100,000 improved M9 models. In 1999, a contract for 25,000 knives was split between LanCay and Ontario (12,500 each).

Ontario Knife Company also participated in later contracts, and is one of the current (as of 2005) contractors for producing them. These can be identified by the blades, which are marked "M-9 / ONTARIO / KNIFE CO / USA".

In 2012, Tri-Technologies was awarded a contract for 40,000 M9s marked "M9/06MA8/USA".

Comparison
The M7 bayonet, introduced in 1964, was used as a bayonet on the M16 rifle and as a fighting knife. The M9 multipurpose bayonet system is used as a bayonet on the M16 series rifle, on the M4 series carbine, as a fighting knife, as a general field and utility knife, as a wire cutter when used on the sheath, and as a saw. The M9 also fits the Mossberg 590 Special Purpose shotgun.

Buck Knives production
An overview of M9 types made by Buck Knives, one of the manufacturers of M9 bayonets. The 5,000 for the U.S. Marines are included under the U.S. Army numbers in this listing.

Users

 : Security forces
 : Australian Defence Force
 : Lautaro Special Operations Brigade
 : Special Duties Unit
 : Armed forces of the Netherlands
 : New Zealand Defence Force
 : Polish Armed Forces
 : Singapore Armed Forces
 : Royal Thai Armed Forces
 : United States Armed Forces (other than the Marine Corps which uses the OKC-3S bayonet)

See also
 Aircrew Survival Egress Knife—ASEK; special knife adopted circa 2003 for Army aviators
 OKC-3S Bayonet—USMC bayonet; adopted in early 2000s for M16/M4 family
 KA-BAR—fighting knife

References

External links

 Army Fact File on Bayonets
 PDF of patent (buck-184.com)
 USMC Multi-purpose Bayonet (MB)
 Olive Drab on the M9
 

Bayonets of the United States
Military equipment introduced in the 1980s